The 1968 Mexican Grand Prix was a Formula One motor race held at the Ciudad Deportiva Magdalena Mixhuca on November 3, 1968. It was race 12 of 12 in both the 1968 World Championship of Drivers and the 1968 International Cup for Formula One Manufacturers.

This race was to determine the World Drivers' Championship, contested between Britons Graham Hill in the Lotus 49B-Ford and Jackie Stewart in the Matra MS10-Ford, and defending champion, New Zealander Denny Hulme in the McLaren M7A-Ford. The race was moved back a week so as not to clash with the Mexico City Summer Olympics, which ended on October 26.

Hulme started with a mathematical chance of becoming world champion, but his McLaren broke a rear suspension member early, crashed, and caught fire. Jo Siffert took the lead, but had to pit with a broken throttle cable.  Stewart fell back with when his engine started to misfire, his car's handling began going off, and had a fuel-feed problem. Hill won this race and his second Drivers' Championship, after Stewart fell back to seventh after an engine problem with his Matra.

The Mexican government's effort to curb civil unrest led to a switch from military police to unarmed policemen and track marshals for crowd control; by race end, spectators were encroaching on the track itself. This was one reason for the ultimate cancellation of future Mexican Grands Prix.

Classification

Qualifying

Race

Championship permutations 
Coming into this race, 3 drivers had a chance to win the title.
 Graham Hill (39pts) needed either
 A podium place, with Stewart 2nd or lower
 4th or 5th, with Hulme 2nd or lower and Stewart 3rd or lower
 6th, with Hulme 2nd or lower and Stewart 4th or lower
 Hulme 2nd or lower and Stewart 5th or lower
 Jackie Stewart (36pts) needed either
 1st
 2nd, with Hulme 3rd or lower and Hill 4th or lower
 3rd, with Hulme 2nd or lower and Hill 6th or lower
 4th, with Hulme 3rd or lower and Hill 7th or lower
 Denny Hulme (33pts) needed
 1st with Hill 4th or lower

Championship standings after the race

Drivers' Championship standings

Constructors' Championship standings

Note: Only the top five positions are included for both sets of standings.

References

Further reading

Mexican Grand Prix
Mexican Grand Prix
1968 in Mexican motorsport
November 1968 sports events in Mexico